La Porte Municipal Airport  is a city-owned public-use airport located three miles (5 km) northwest of the central business district of La Porte, a city in Harris County, Texas, United States.

Facilities and aircraft 

For the 12-month period ending June 5, 2007, the airport had 79,433 general aviation aircraft operations, an average of 217 per day. At that time there were 95 aircraft based at the airport: 87% single-engine, 9% multi-engine, 1% jet and 2% helicopter.

Accidents and incidents
On July 15, 2018, two people were killed when a homebuilt Kolb Twinstar III crashed into a pipeline easement 300 yards from the end of the runway.

References

External links 

 at Texas DOT web site

Airports in Harris County, Texas
Galveston Bay Area